The white-cheeked bushtit (Aegithalos leucogenys), also known as the white-cheeked tit, is a species of bird in the family Aegithalidae.  It is found in Afghanistan, India, and Pakistan.

References

white-cheeked bushtit
Birds of Afghanistan
Birds of Pakistan
white-cheeked bushtit
Taxonomy articles created by Polbot